The Victoria Golf and Country Resort is one of the newest Golf Clubs in Sri Lanka.

The resort is situated on a former  coconut and coffee plantation, located adjacent to the Victoria Reservoir. The concept was initially conceived by Mark Bostock, the former Chairman of John Keells Holdings in 1950s. The 18-hole golf course was designed to USPGA specifications by golf architects, Donald Steel and Martin Ebert.  Construction commenced in 1996 and was completed in January 1999. The course was named "Best in Asia" in 2005 by the publication Asian Golf, and is also ranked in the top 100 of "Most Beautiful Courses in the World" by Golf Digest.

See also
Royal Colombo Golf Club
Nuwara Eliya Golf Club

References

Golf clubs and courses in Sri Lanka
Sports venues completed in 1999
Sports venues in Central Province, Sri Lanka
Golf clubs and courses designed by Donald Steel
1999 establishments in Sri Lanka